Francesco Verde may refer to:
 Francesco Verde (bishop)
 Francesco Verde (footballer)